Martin Rosemann (born 20 October 1976) is a German economist and politician of the Social Democratic Party (SPD) who has been serving as a member of the Bundestag from the state of Baden-Württemberg since 2013.

Early life and education 
From 1996 until 2001, Rosemann studied economics at the University of Tübingen, on a scholarship of the German Academic Scholarship Foundation. He subsequently worked at the university’s Institute for Applied Economic Research (IAW) from 2002 until 2011 and later headed the Berlin office of the Institute for Social Research (ISG) from 2011 until 2013.

Political career 
From 2000 until 2003, Rosemann served as chairman of the Young Socialists in Baden-Württemberg. 

Rosemann first became a member of the Bundestag in the 2013 German federal election, representing Tübingen. He has since been a member of the Committee on Labour and Social Affairs, where he serves as his parliamentary group's rapporteur on pensions in Germany.

In the negotiations to form a coalition government under the leadership of Chancellor Angela Merkel following the 2017 federal elections, Rosemann was part of the working group on digital policy, led Helge Braun, Dorothee Bär and Lars Klingbeil.

In the negotiations to form a so-called traffic light coalition of the SPD, the Green Party and the Free Democrats (FDP) following the 2021 German elections, Rosemann was part of his party's delegation in the working group on social policy, co-chaired by Dagmar Schmidt, Sven Lehmann and Johannes Vogel.

Other activities 
 German United Services Trade Union (ver.di), Member

References

External links 

  
 Bundestag biography 

1976 births
Living people
Members of the Bundestag for Baden-Württemberg
Members of the Bundestag 2021–2025
Members of the Bundestag 2017–2021
Members of the Bundestag 2013–2017
Members of the Bundestag for the Social Democratic Party of Germany